This list of Bangladeshi architects includes notable architects who were born in Bangladesh.

A 

Return to top of page

C 

Return to top of page

H 

Return to top of page

I 

Return to top of page

K 

Return to top of page

N 

Return to top of page

O 

Return to top of page

P 

Return to top of page

T 

Return to top of page

U 

Return to top of page

W

See also

 Architecture of Bangladesh
 Institute of Architects Bangladesh
 National Parliament Building
 List of Bangladeshi people

References

Bangladeshi
Architects